Meymeh District is a district (bakhsh) in Shahin Shahr and Meymeh County, Isfahan Province, Iran. At the 2006 census, its population was 21,491, in 6,286 families.  The District has three cities: Meymeh, Vazvan & Lay Bid.  The District has two rural districts (dehestan): Vandadeh Rural District and Zarkan Rural District.

References 

Shahin Shahr and Meymeh County
Districts of Isfahan Province